was a Japanese track and field athlete. She competed in the women's high jump at the 1932 Summer Olympics.

References

1913 births
1967 deaths
Place of birth missing
Japanese female high jumpers
Olympic female high jumpers
Olympic athletes of Japan
Athletes (track and field) at the 1932 Summer Olympics
Japan Championships in Athletics winners
20th-century Japanese women